Antônio "Tonho" José Gil (born 18 August 1957) is a Brazilian former footballer who played as a midfielder. He competed in the 1984 Summer Olympics with the Brazil national under-23 football team.

Honours

Player
Grêmio
 Copa Libertadores: 1983
 Intercontinental Cup: 1983

Manager
Inter de Lages
 Campeonato Catarinense Série B: 2000

Ypiranga de Erechim
 Campeonato Gaúcho Série B: 2008
 Campeonato Gaúcho do Interior: 2009

References

1957 births
Living people
People from Criciúma
Brazilian footballers
Brazilian football managers
Association football midfielders
Olympic footballers of Brazil
Footballers at the 1984 Summer Olympics
Olympic silver medalists for Brazil
Olympic medalists in football
Campeonato Brasileiro Série A players
Sport Club Internacional players
Operário Futebol Clube (MS) players
Grêmio Foot-Ball Porto Alegrense players
Clube Esportivo Aimoré players
Avaí FC players
Associação Atlética Internacional (Limeira) players
São José Esporte Clube players
Associação Atlética Ponte Preta players
Esporte Clube São José managers
Clube de Regatas Brasil managers
Esporte Clube Internacional de Lages managers
Clube Atlético Hermann Aichinger managers
Clube Náutico Marcílio Dias managers
Brusque Futebol Clube managers
Ypiranga Futebol Clube managers
Futebol Clube Santa Cruz managers
São José Esporte Clube managers
Sociedade Esportiva Recreativa e Cultural Brasil managers
Sport Club São Paulo managers
Grêmio Esportivo Glória managers
Medalists at the 1984 Summer Olympics
Sportspeople from Santa Catarina (state)